The original Benalla District Football League was formed in 1929 from the following clubs - Baddaginnie, Benalla - "B", Swanpool, Tatong, Thoona and Winton.

The Benalla & District Football League (B&DFL) was formed immediately after World War Two in 1946 and an Australian rules football competition based in the Benalla region of Victoria, Australia and ran until 2009.

History
The B&DFL was formed in 1946 and superseded the former Tatong & Thoona Football Association after World War Two. 

In 1968, Benalla All Blacks kicked 45.31 - 301 against Devenish: 1.0 - 6, with All Black's Gavin Cherry kicking 19 goals. 

In round thirteen of 1981, Glenrowan: 46.18 - 294 defeated Longwood: 1.1 - 7, with Glenrowan's R Fitzgerald kicking 18 goals.

The Victorian Country Football League shut the competition down at the end of the 2009 season when the VCFL policy of leagues having a minimum of six clubs could not be met. 

The five remaining clubs joined the following leagues during the 2009 post-season. 
 Bonnie Doon: Ovens & King Football League
 Goorambat & District: Ovens & King Football League
 Longwood: Kyabram & District Football League
 Swanpool: Ovens & King Football League (went into recess in 2014) 
 Tatong: Ovens & King Football League (went into recess in 2014)

League Competition History
The football association commenced in 1929 and has changed its name several times during their 81 years:
 1929-1931: Benalla District Football League
 1932-1940: Tatong and Thoona Football Association
 1941-1945: Recess - World War II
 1946-2009: Benalla & District Football League

Former Clubs: 1929-2009
 Baddaginnie Football Club: Foundation member. contested 1929, 1934-1935 seasons - folded in 1936.
 Benalla All Blacks Football Club: contested 1934-1940; 1953-1976 seasons - joined Ovens & King Football League in 2005.
 Benalla Football Club Juniors: Foundation member - contested from 1929 to 1931 seasons. Changed their name to Benalla Imperials FC in 1932 and joined the Euroa Line Football Association. Benalla Imperials merged with the Benalla Football Club in 1934 and Benalla Seniors played in the Benalla Mulwala FA, while the Benalla Reserves played in the Benalla Yarrawonga Lines FA in 1934. 
Benalla Football Club 2nds: 1946. Joined the Murray Valley North East Football League in 1947. Played in the Benalla Tungamah Football League from 1948 to 1952, then joined the Ovens and Murray Football League Reserves competition in 1953.
Benalla Football Club 3rds (U/21 team): 1947 to 1952. Players went into the newly formed Benalla Junior Football League in 1953.
Benalla Rovers: Played in the North East Football Association in 1920 and 1921.   Then the Yarrawonga Line FA from 1922 to 1928, then played in the O&MFL in 1929 and 1930. In recess from 1931 to 1975. Played in the Benalla & DFL from 1976 to 1989, when they went into recess.
Bonnie Doon Football Club: 1965 - 2009, joined the Ovens & King Football League in 2010.Devenish Football Club: 1963 to 2006 Went into recess
Dookie Collegians Football Club Seconds: 1948, 1961
Glenrowan Football Club: 1934-1938 & 1946 - 1959. In recess in 1960. 1963 - 1991. Joined the Ovens & King Football League in 1992.
Glenrowan-Thoona United Football Club 1961 & 1962. 
Longwood Football Club: 1970 to 2009
Molyullah Football Club: contested 1933-1934 seasons - folded in 1935.North Wangaratta Football Club: 1953 to 1960. Joined the Ovens & King Football League in 1961.
Strathbogie Football Club: 1961, 
Swanpool Football Club: Foundation member. 1929 - 1931, 1932 - 1940, 1946 - 2009
Tatong Football Club: Foundation member. 1929 - 1931, 1932 - 1940 ?
 Thoona Football Club: "Maroons" (Maroon with blue sash): Foundation member - contested 1929-1931, 1932-1940; 1946-1967 seasons - folded in 1968.Thornton-Eildon Football Club: 1986 - 1994. Joined the Goulburn Valley FNL – Division 2 in 1995.
Tolmie Football Club: 1952 - 1962, 
Violet Town Football Club: 1930, 1978 - 1995. Joined the Goulburn Valley Football League Division Two in 1996.
Winton Football Club: Foundation member - contested 1929-31; 1947-1957 seasons - folded in 1958. Senior Football Premierships / Runner Up: 1929 to 2009 

Benalla District Football League. 
(Nichols & Sullivan Jewellers Shield)
 1929: Winton: 3.19 - 37 d Benalla Juniors: 4.12 - 36
 1930: Benalla Juniors: 9.16 - 70 d Swanpool: 7.10 - 52
 1931: Benalla Juniors: 10.14 - 74 d Swanpool: 5.6 - 36
Tatong / Thoona Football Association
 1932: Thoona
 1933: Swanpool: 10.8 - 68 d Thoona: 7.13 - 55
 1934: Benalla All Blacks: 6.6 - 42 d Tatong: 5.10 - 40 (1st G/Final) #
 1934: Tatong: 12.15 - 87 d Glenrowan: 10.6 - 66 (2nd G/Final)
 1935: Goorambat: 9.6 - 60 d Tatong: 4.10 - 34
 1936: Benalla All Blacks: 12.24 - 96 d Violet Town: 10.12 - 72
 1937: Benalla All Blacks: 13.9 - 87 d Violet Town: 10.14 - 74
 1938: Violet Town: 17.15 - 117 d Benalla All Blacks: 12.11 - 83
 1939: Violet Town: 12.15 - 87 d Tatong: 4.6 - 30
 1940: Benalla All Blacks: 13.9 - 87* d Violet Town: 9.5 - 39
 1941: Recess - World War II 1942: Recess - World War II 1943: Recess - World War II 1944: Recess - World War II 1945: Recess - World War II''
Benalla & District Football League
 1946: Benalla 2nds: 12.17.89 d Violet Town 12.11 - 83
 1947: Goorambat: 8.7 - 55 d Swanpool: 7.7 - 49
 1948: Dookie Collegians: 8.22 - 70 d Goorambat: 2.11 - 23
 1949: Goorambat: 9.10 - 64 d Benalla 3rds: 8.6 - 54
 1950: Winton: 6.14 - 50 d Goorambat: 6.9 - 45
 1951: Swanpool: 12.4.76 defeated Winton 5.16.46.
 1952: Tolmie: 7.10.52 defeated Tatong 7.8.50.
 1953: Benalla All Blacks: 11.16 - 82 d Tatong: 7.13 - 55
 1954: Benalla All Blacks: 12.14 - 86 d Glenrowan: 6.12 - 48
 1955: Glenrowan: 14.9 - 93 d Swanpool: 9.16 - 70
 1956: Benalla All Blacks: 13.10 - 88 d Glenrowan 11.6 - 72
 1957: Swanpool: 9.9 - 63 d Glenrowan: 7.14 - 56
 1958: North Wangaratta: 18.14 - 122 d Goorambat: 9.10 - 64
 1959: Goorambat: 16.10 - 106 d Tatong: 8.9 - 57
 1960: Tatong: 13.9.87 defeated North Wangaratta 10.8.68
 1961: Tatong: 12.14.86 defeated Swanpool 8.13.61
 1962: Tatong: 10.16.76 defeated Swanpool 10.15.75
 1963: Goorambat: 6.8 - 44 d Swanpool: 5.13 - 43
 1964: Goorambat: 10.7 - 67 d Strathbogie: 6.8 - 44
 1965: Goorambat: 9.19 - 73 d Bonnie Doon: 10.4 - 64
 1966: Bonnie Doon: 14.9 - 93 d Benalla All Blacks: 13.10 - 88
 1967: Benalla All Blacks: 13.18 - 96 d Bonnie Doon: 11.9 - 75
 1968: Benalla All Blacks: 13.16 - 94 d Glenrowan: 13.9 - 87
 1969: Glenrowan: 13.14 - 92 d Benalla All Blacks: 11.9 - 75
 1970: Glenrowan: 15.8 - 98 d Benalla All Blacks: 13.11 - 89
 1971: Benalla All Blacks: 13.6 - 84 d Glenrowan: 11.4 - 70
 1972: Tatong: 17.11 - 113 d Swanpool: 10.14 - 74
 1973: Tatong: 12.13 - 85 d Longwood: 10.8 - 68
 1974: Goorambat
 1975: Tatong: 15.16 - 106 d Bonnie Doon: 9.11 - 65
 1976: Benalla All Blacks: 18.19 - 115 d Tatong: 9.7 - 61
 1977: Longwood: d Benalla All Blacks: by 8 goals
 1978: Goorambat: 16.16 - 112 d Glenrowan: 16.11 - 107
 1979: Goorambat: d Glenrowan:
 1980: Glenrowan: 16.6 - 102 d Tatong: 15.7 - 97
 1981: Glenrowan: 17.13 -  115 d Tatong: 14.11 - 95
 1982: Violet Town: 13.10.88 d Bonnie Doon 10.13.73
 1983: Strathbogie: 8.10.58 d Bonnie Doon: 6.12.48
 1984: Tatong: 16.18 - 114 d Bonnie Doon: 6.15 - 51
 1985: Longwood: 23.13 - 151 d Goorambat: 12.6 - 78
 1986: Benalla Rovers: 16.11.107 defeated Longwood 11.14.80
 1987: Violet Town: 14.16.100 d Tatong: 11.8.74
 1988: Tatong
 1989: Bonnie Doon
 1990: Violet Town d Thornton-Eildon Districts
 1991: Thornton-Eildon: 19.9 - 123 d Violet Town: 6.10 - 46 
 1992: Thornton-Eildon: 14.10 - 94 d Bonnie Doon: 12.15 - 87
 1993: Thornton-Eildon d Bonnie Doon
 1994: Tatong d Bonnie Doon
 1995: Tatong: 19.8.122 defeated Longwood 16.14.110 at Benalla Showgrounds
 1996: Tatong
 1997: Swanpool
 1998: Swanpool: 9.15.69 defeated Bonnie Doon 8.12.60
 1999: Bonnie Doon: 17.14 - 116 d Goorambat: 9.6 - 60
 2000: Longwood
 2001: Goorambat: 10.13 - 73 d Bonnie Doon: 4.5 - 29
 2002: Bonnie Doon: 12.18.90 defeated Longwood 13.8.86
 2003: Devenish
 2004: Bonnie Doon 
 2005: Devenish: d Goorambat:
 2006: Goorambat
 2007: Goorambat: 19.10 - 124 d Bonnie Doon: 13.11 - 89
 2008: Bonnie Doon: 10.17 - 77 d Goorambat: 11.6 - 72
 2009: Bonnie Doon: 19.12 - 126 d Swanpool: 4.9 - 33

Notes 
 - In 1934, Benalla All Blacks won the first grand final, then Glenrowan FC protested against an unregistered player. Tatong then defeated Glenrowan in the 2nd grand final.
 - In 1940 Benalla All Blacks were undefeated Premiers.

Football Best & Fairest Awards
Tatong & Thoona Football Association

Benalla & District Football League
Seniors

Leading Goal Kickers

Senior Seasons

2007 Ladder and Finals

2008 Ladder and Finals

2009 Ladder and Finals

References

External links
Full Points Footy -Benalla & District Football League
Official Benalla & District Football League Website
1929 - Benalla District Football League Premiers: Winton FC team photo

Defunct Australian rules football competitions in Victoria (Australia)